Wizards’ Conclave is a fantasy novel by Douglas Niles, set in the world of Dragonlance, and based on the Dungeons & Dragons role-playing game. It is the fifth novel in the Age of Mortals series. It was published in paperback in July 2004.

Plot summary
Wizards’ Conclave explores the lives of characters from The War of Souls trilogy, describing events that directly overlap the events of those stories.

Reception

References

2004 American novels

Dragonlance novels
The Age of Mortals series novels